Brahmachari is a 1972 Indian Malayalam language film, directed by J. Sasikumar and produced by S. S. T. Lakshmanan, S. S. T. Subramaniyam and Thiruppathi Chettiyar. The film stars Prem Nazir, Sharada, Adoor Bhasi and Jose Prakash in the lead roles. The film had musical score by V. Dakshinamoorthy. The film was a remake of the 1967 Tamil film Penne Nee Vaazhga and Hindi film Ek Nari Ek Brahmachari.

Cast 

Prem Nazir as Jayachandran
Sharada as Sreedevi/Vasanthy
Adoor Bhasi as Veeramarthandan Pilla
Bahadoor as Soman
T. R. Omana as Bhargavi Pilla
Jose Prakash as Venugopal
Rani Chandra as Vimala
Sujatha as Suvarna
Kunchan as Kuttappan
Sankaradi as Unnithan
Baby
T. S. Muthaiah as Sreedevi's father
V. D. Rajappan as the Appunni
Yamuna
Ambili
Girija
John Varghese
Justin
Oolan Ramu
Treesa

Soundtrack 
The music was composed by V. Dakshinamoorthy and the lyrics were written by Vayalar Ramavarma.

References

External links 
 

1972 films
1970s Malayalam-language films
Films directed by J. Sasikumar
Malayalam remakes of Tamil films